Omar Hayat (born 11 October 1983) is a Danish cricketer.

Career
In September 2016, he was named in Denmark's squad for the 2016 ICC World Cricket League Division Four tournament in the United States. He played in Denmark's fourth match of the tournament, against the United States. In May 2019, he was named in Denmark's squad for a five-match series against Leinster Lightning in Ireland, in preparation for the Regional Finals of the 2018–19 ICC T20 World Cup Europe Qualifier tournament in Guernsey. The same month, he was named in Denmark's squad for the Regional Finals qualification tournament. He made his Twenty20 International (T20I) debut for Denmark, against Guernsey, on 20 June 2019.

References

External links
 

1983 births
Living people
Danish cricketers
Denmark Twenty20 International cricketers
Place of birth missing (living people)
Sportspeople from Copenhagen
Danish people of Pakistani descent